Cyrtandra (New Latin, from Greek , kyrtós, "curved", and , anḗr, "male", in reference to their prominently curved stamens) is a genus of flowering plants containing about 600 species, with more being discovered often, and is thus the largest genus in the family Gesneriaceae. These plants are native to Southeast Asia, Australia, and the Pacific Islands, with the centre of diversity in Southeast Asia and the Malesian region. The genus is common, but many species within it are very rare, localized, and endangered endemic plants. The species can be difficult to identify because they are highly polymorphic and because they readily hybridize with each other. The plants may be small herbs, vines, shrubs, epiphytes, or trees. The genus is characterized in part by having two stamens, and most species have white flowers, with a few red-, orange-, yellow-, and pink-flowered species known. Almost all species live in rainforest habitats.

It is an example of a supertramp genus.

Hawaiian Cyrtandra are known as ha‘iwale.

Species

Selected species include:
Cyrtandra aurantiicarpa
Cyrtandra biserrata – Molokai cyrtandra
Cyrtandra calyptribracteata
Cyrtandra cleopatrae
Cyrtandra confertiflora – lava cyrtandra
Cyrtandra cordifolia – the Latin name means cyrtandra with heart-shaped leaves
Cyrtandra crenata – Kahana Valley cyrtandra
Cyrtandra cyaneoides – mapele
Cyrtandra dentata – mountain cyrtandra
Cyrtandra elatostemoides
Cyrtandra elegans
Cyrtandra ferripilosa – red-hair cyrtandra
Cyrtandra filipes – gulch cyrtandra
Cyrtandra garnotiana – hahala
Cyrtandra giffardii – forest cyrtandra
Cyrtandra gracilis – Palolo Valley cyrtandra
Cyrtandra grandiflora – largeflower cyrtandra
Cyrtandra grayana – Pacific cyrtandra
Cyrtandra grayi – Gray's cyrtandra
Cyrtandra halawensis – toothleaf cyrtandra
Cyrtandra hashimotoi – Maui cyrtandra
Cyrtandra hawaiensis – Hawaii cyrtandra
Cyrtandra heinrichii – lava cyrtandra  
Cyrtandra hematos – singleflower cyrtandra
Cyrtandra hirtigera
Cyrtandra hypochrysoides
Cyrtandra kalihii – Koolau Range cyrtandra
Cyrtandra kamooloaensis – Kamo'oloa cyrtandra
Cyrtandra kauaiensis – ulunahele
Cyrtandra kealiae
Cyrtandra kealiae ssp. kealiae (syn. C. limahuliensis)
Cyrtandra kealiae ssp. urceolata
Cyrtandra kohalae – Kohala Mountain cyrtandra
Cyrtandra laxiflora – Oahu cyrtandra
Cyrtandra lessoniana – Lesson's cyrtandra
Cyrtandra macraei – upland cyrtandra
Cyrtandra menziesii – ha'i wale
Cyrtandra munroi – Lanaihale cyrtandra
Cyrtandra nitens
Cyrtandra oenobarba – shaggystem cyrtandra
Cyrtandra olona – Kauai cyrtandra
Cyrtandra oxybapha – Pohakea Gulch cyrtandra
Cyrtandra paliku – cliffside cyrtandra
Cyrtandra paludosa – kanaweo ke'oke'o
Cyrtandra platyphylla – 'ilihia
Cyrtandra polyantha – Niu Valley cyrtandra
Cyrtandra pruinosa – frosted cyrtandra
Cyrtandra pulgarensis
Cyrtandra samoensis 
Cyrtandra sessilis – windyridge cyrtandra
Cyrtandra subumbellata – parasol cyrtandra
Cyrtandra tahuatensis
Cyrtandra tintinnabula – Laupahoehoe cyrtandra
Cyrtandra umbellifera
Cyrtandra viridiflora – greenleaf cyrtandra
Cyrtandra waiolani – fuzzyflower cyrtandra
Cyrtandra wawrae – rockface cyrtandra

References

Further reading

External links

 
Gesneriaceae genera